Google Charts is an interactive Web service that creates graphical charts from user-supplied information.
The user supplies data and a formatting specification expressed in JavaScript embedded in a Web page; in response the service sends an image of the chart.

See also
JavaScript framework
JavaScript library

External links
 
 Spanish example

References 

Charts
JavaScript visualization toolkits
Visualization API